Philip Carteret Hill (August 13, 1821 – September 15, 1894) was a Nova Scotia politician. Born in Halifax, he was mayor of Halifax from 1861 to 1864 before entering provincial politics as a supporter of Canadian confederation in 1867 serving as Provincial Secretary in the Conservative cabinet of Hiram Blanchard but lost his seat in the fall 1867 election that defeated the government.

Hill returned to the legislature in 1870 by winning a by-election as a Liberal-Conservative. He again lost his seat in 1871 but returned in 1874 and served in the Liberal government of William Annand as provincial secretary. Feelings against confederation had abated and Hill was well placed to put forward a compromise position that enabled him to succeed Annand as premier in 1875. However, Hill took over the Liberal government at a time that the federal Liberals were in power under Prime Minister Alexander Mackenzie and becoming increasingly unpopular in Nova Scotia. That, and the failure of the Annand and Hill governments to make progress on railway construction, led to the Liberal's defeat in the 1878 election after which Hill retired from politics. He moved to England in 1882 and published a series theological pamphlets. He died in Tunbridge Wells.

External links 
 

1821 births
1894 deaths
Canadian Anglicans
Nova Scotia Liberal Party MLAs
Progressive Conservative Association of Nova Scotia MLAs
Premiers of Nova Scotia
Mayors of Halifax, Nova Scotia
Colony of Nova Scotia people
Canadian people of English descent
Nova Scotia political party leaders